Euler's "lucky" numbers are positive integers n such that for all integers k with , the polynomial  produces a prime number.

When k is equal to n, the value cannot be prime since  is divisible by n. These polynomials are all members of the larger set of prime generating polynomials.

Leonhard Euler published the polynomial  which produces prime numbers for all integer values of k from 1 to 40. Only 7 lucky numbers of Euler exist, namely 1, 2, 3, 5, 11, 17 and 41 . Note that these numbers are all prime numbers except for 1.

The primes of the form k2 − k + 41 are
41, 43, 47, 53, 61, 71, 83, 97, 113, 131, 151, 173, 197, 223, 251, 281, 313, 347, 383, 421, 461, 503, 547, 593, 641, 691, 743, 797, 853, 911, 971, ... .

Euler's lucky numbers are unrelated to the "lucky numbers" defined by a sieve algorithm. In fact, the only number which is both lucky and Euler-lucky is 3, since all other Euler-lucky numbers are congruent to 2 modulo 3, but no lucky numbers are congruent to 2 modulo 3.

See also
Heegner number
List of topics named after Leonhard Euler
Formula for primes
Ulam spiral

References

Literature
 Le Lionnais, F. Les Nombres Remarquables. Paris: Hermann, pp. 88 and 144, 1983.
 Leonhard Euler, Extrait d'un lettre de M. Euler le pere à M. Bernoulli concernant le Mémoire imprimé parmi ceux de 1771, p. 318 (1774). Euler Archive - All Works. 461.

External links
 

Integer sequences
Prime numbers
Leonhard Euler